St Mary's Church, Ilkeston is a Grade II* listed parish church in the Church of England in Ilkeston, Derbyshire. Built in the 14th century, it is known as the "Mollis Chapel" because of a stained glass window which shows the rising sun above the cross which was fixed to it by the local saint.

History

The church was founded in 1150, the oldest visible part of the fabric being the three Norman arches in the south arcade which date from the close of the 12th century when the Norman Stye was changing into early English.  An architectural report in 1855  said that 'no church in englan possesses any euql to them and they can never be surpassed in the lightness of their tracery.

Also remarkable is the arcade between the chancel and Peter Chapel with its Early English Arches whose capitals are decorated with small bossy leaves in which can be seen the impish faces of the green men of the forest.

Between the chancel and the Peter Chapel is the recumbent stone effigy and chest tomb of Sir Nicholas de Cantilupe (d.1266) of Withcall in Lincolnshire, Greasley in Nottinghamshire and Ilkeston in Derbyshire, who married Eustachia FitzHugh, daughter and heiress of Ralph FitzHugh of Greasley. His son was William de Cantilupe, 1st Baron Cantilupe (1262-1308) of Greasley and of Ravensthorpe Castle in the parish of Boltby, North Yorkshire. The monument would once have stood in a central position and was mentioned as being in the chancel in 1662 and again in 1716.

The spire on the tower was destroyed by a lightning strike in 1714.

It was extensively restored between 1853 and 1855 by Thomas Larkins Walker. The north and south aisles were rebuilt, and they were restored to their original length towards the west. The chantry chapel was rebuilt to accommodate nearly 300 children. The chancel arch was restored and the tower was re-cased. A new vestry was added on the foundations of the old sacristry, adjoining the south wall of the chapel. New seating and flooring was fitted, and new heating and lighting was installed. The contractor was Lindley and Fearn of Leicester. It was reopened on 18 October 1855.

The west end was enlarged and rebuilt between 1909 and 1910 by Percy Heylyn Currey when the tower was removed stone by stone and rebuilt as it is seen today. It was reopened for worship on 20 September 1910 by the Bishop of Southwell.

Organ

The church contains an organ by Bishop dating from 1831 which was originally in the church of St John the Evangelist in Paddington where it was reputedly played by Mendelssohn. A specification of the organ can be found on the National Pipe Organ Register.

Organists
Cecil Wyer 1919 - ????

Bells
The church has eight bells (tenor 17cwt), which were recast by John Taylor of Loughborough in 1910. They underwent an extensive restoration, including rehanging, in 2015.

See also
Grade II* listed buildings in Erewash
Listed buildings in Ilkeston

References

External links
 Local history society - St. Mary's

Church of England church buildings in Derbyshire
Grade II* listed churches in Derbyshire